Isla San Cosme, is an island in the Gulf of California east of the Baja California Peninsula. The island is uninhabited and is part of the Loreto Municipality.

Biology
Isla San Cosme has three species of reptiles: Aspidoscelis tigris (tiger whiptail),  Sauromalus ater (common chuckwalla), and Urosaurus nigricauda (black-tailed brush lizard).

References

Further reading

Islands of Baja California Sur
Islands of the Gulf of California
Loreto Municipality (Baja California Sur)
Uninhabited islands of Mexico